Beaver Creek is a stream in Rock County, Minnesota and Minnehaha County, South Dakota. It is a tributary of Split Rock Creek.

Beaver Creek was named from the fact early settlers saw beaver dams in the stream.

See also
List of rivers of Minnesota
List of rivers of South Dakota

References

Rivers of Minnehaha County, South Dakota
Rivers of Rock County, Minnesota
Rivers of Minnesota
Rivers of South Dakota